The 2001 If Stockholm Open was a men's tennis tournament played on indoor hard courts at the Kungliga tennishallen in Stockholm, Sweden and was part of the International Series of the 2001 ATP Tour. It was the 33rd edition of the tournament and ran from 22 October through 28 October 2001. Sixth-seeded Sjeng Schalken won the singles title.

Finals

Singles

 Sjeng Schalken defeated  Jarkko Nieminen 3–6, 6–3, 6–3, 4–6, 6–3
 It was Schalken's 1st singles title of the year and the 6th of his career.

Doubles

 Donald Johnson /  Jared Palmer defeated  Jonas Björkman /  Todd Woodbridge 6–3, 4–6, 6–3
 It was Johnson's 7th title of the year and the 21st of his career. It was Palmer's 6th title of the year and the 23rd of his career.

References

External links
 Official website 
 Official website 
 ATP tournament profile

 
If Stockholm Open
Stockholm Open
If Stockholm Open
2000s in Stockholm
Open